Bere is a village in Ghanzi District of Botswana. It is located in the southern part of the district, and it has a primary school. The population was 778 in 2011 census. Bere is now one of the few places in the Central Kalahari where Persistence hunting is still practised.

References

 

Ghanzi District
Villages in Botswana